A motorboat, speedboat or powerboat is a boat that is exclusively powered by an engine.

Some motorboats are fitted with inboard engines, others have an outboard motor installed on the rear, containing the internal combustion engine, the gearbox and the propeller in one portable unit. An inboard-outboard contains a hybrid of an inboard and an outboard, where the internal combustion engine is installed inside the boat, and the gearbox and propeller are outside.

There are two configurations of an inboard, V-drive and direct drive.  A direct drive has the powerplant mounted near the middle of the boat with the propeller shaft straight out the back, where a V-drive has the powerplant mounted in the back of the boat facing backwards having the shaft go towards the front of the boat then making a V towards the rear.

Overview

A motorboat has one or more engines that propel the vessel over the top of the water. Boat engines vary in shape, size, and type. Engines are installed either inboard or outboard. Inboard engines are part of the boat construction, while outboard engines are secured to the transom and hang off the back of the boat. Motorboat engines run on gasoline or diesel fuel. Engines come in various types. Engines vary in fuel types such as gasoline, diesel, gas turbine, rotary combustion or steam. Motorboats are commonly used for recreation, sport, or racing. Boat racing is a sport where drivers and engineers compete for fastest boat. The American Powerboat Association (APBA) splits the sport into categories. The categories include inboard, inboard endurance, professional outboard, stock outboard, unlimited outboard performance craft, drag, modified outboard, and offshore. Engines and hulls categorize racing. The two types of hull shape are runabout and hydroplane. Runabout is a v-shape and hydroplane is flat and stepped. The type of hull used depends on the type of water the boat is in and how the boat is being used. Hulls can be made of wood, fiberglass or metal but most hulls today are fiberglass.

High performance speedboats can reach speeds of over 50 knots. Their high speed and performance can be attributed to their hull technology and powerful engine. With a more powerful and heavier engine, an appropriate hull shape is needed. High performance boats include yachts, HSIC (high speed interceptor craft) and racing powerboats.

A V-type hull helps a boat cut through the water. A deep V-hull helps keep the boat's bow down at low speeds, improving visibility. V-hulls also improve a boat's speed and maneuvering capabilities. They stabilize a boat in rough conditions.

History

Invention

Although the screw propeller had been added to an engine (steam engine) as early as the 18th century in Birmingham, England, by James Watt, boats powered by a petrol engine only came about in the later part of the 19th century with the invention of the internal combustion engine.

The earliest boat to be powered by a petrol engine was tested on the Neckar River by Gottlieb Daimler and Wilhelm Maybach in 1886, when they tested their new "longcase clock" engine. It had been constructed in the former greenhouse (converted into a workshop) in Daimler's back yard. The first public display took place on the Waldsee in Cannstatt, today a suburb of Stuttgart, at the end of that year. The engine of this boat had a single cylinder of 1 horse power. Daimler's second launch in 1887 had a second cylinder positioned at an angle of 15 degrees to the first one, and was known as the "V-type".

The first successful motor boat was designed by the Priestman Brothers in Hull, England, under the direction of William Dent Priestman. The company began trials of their first motorboat in 1888. The engine was powered with kerosene and used an innovative high-tension (high voltage) ignition system. The company was the first to begin large scale production of the motor boat, and by 1890, Priestman's boats were successfully being used for towing goods along canals.

Another early pioneer was Mr. J. D. Roots, who in 1891 fitted a launch with an internal combustion engine and operated a ferry service between Richmond and Wandsworth along the River Thames during the seasons of 1891 and 1892.

The eminent inventor Frederick William Lanchester recognized the potential of the motorboat and over the following 15 years, in collaboration with his brother George, perfected the modern motorboat, or powerboat. Working in the garden of their home in Olton, Warwickshire, they designed and built a river flat-bottomed launch with an advanced high-revving engine that drove via a stern paddle wheel in 1893. In 1897, he produced a second engine similar in design to his previous one but running on benzene at 800 r.p.m. The engine drove a reversible propeller. An important part of his new engine was the revolutionary carburettor, for mixing the fuel and air correctly. His invention was known as a "wick carburetor", because fuel was drawn into a series of wicks, from where it was vaporized. He patented this invention in 1905.

The Daimler Company began production of motor boats in 1897 from its manufacturing base in Coventry. The engines had two cylinders and the explosive charge of petroleum and air was ignited by compression into a heated platinum tube. The engine gave about six horse-power. The petrol was fed by air pressure to a large surface carburettor and also an auxiliary tank which supplied the burners for heating the ignition tubes. Reversal of the propeller was effected by means of two bevel friction wheels which engaged with two larger bevel friction wheels, the intermediate shaft being temporarily disconnected for this purpose. It was not until 1901 that a safer apparatus for igniting the fuel with an electric spark was used in motor boats.

Expansion

Interest in fast motorboats grew rapidly in the early years of the 20th century. The Marine Motor Association was formed in 1903 as an offshoot of the Royal Automobile Club. Motor Boat & Yachting was the first magazine to address technical developments in the field and was brought out by Temple Press, London from 1904. Large manufacturing companies, including Napier & Son and Thornycroft began producing motorboats.

The first motorboating competition was established by Alfred Charles William Harmsworth in 1903. The Harmsworth Cup was envisioned as a contest between nations, rather than between boats or individuals. The boats were originally to be designed and built entirely by residents of the country represented, using materials and units built wholly within that country.

The first competition, held in July 1903, at Cork Harbour in Ireland, and officiated by the Automobile Club of Great Britain and Ireland and the Royal Victoria Yacht Club, was a very primitive affair, with many boats failing even to start. The competition was won by Dorothy Levitt in a Napier launch designed to the specifications of Selwyn Edge. This motorboat was the first proper motorboat designed for high speed. She set the world's first water speed record when she achieved  in a  steel-hulled, 75-horsepower Napier speedboat fitted with a three-blade propeller. As both the owner and entrant of the boat, "S. F. Edge" was engraved on the trophy as the winner.

An article in the Cork Constitution on 13 July reported "A large number of spectators viewed the first mile from the promenade of the Yacht Club, and at Cork several thousand people collected at both sides of the river to see the finishes." Levitt was then commanded to the Royal yacht of King Edward VII where he congratulated her on her pluck and skill, and they discussed the performance of the motorboat and its potential for British government despatch work.

France won the race in 1904, and the boat Napier II set a new world water speed record for a mile at almost 30 knots (56 km/h), winning the race in 1905.

The acknowledged genius of motor boat design in America was the naval architect John L. Hacker. The Harmsworth Cup was first won by Americans in 1907. The US and England traded it back and forth until 1920. From 1920 to 1933, Americans had an unbroken winning streak. Gar Wood won this race eight times as a driver and nine times as an owner between 1920 and 1933.

Hull type  
The type of hull depends on the usage and type of water that the boat is being used in. Types of hulls include displacement hulls, vee-bottom hulls, modified vee-bottom hulls, deep-vee hulls and trim tabs for vee-bottom hulls. Hulls can be made of different materials. The three main materials are wood, reinforced fiberglass and metal. Wood hulls may be made of planks or plywood. Fiberglass hulls are reinforced with balsa wood. Metal hulls are either aluminum or steel.
The hulls of recreational motorboats are distinguished between day cruiser, bow rider, pilothouse and cabin cruiser. The upper construction of each has different features according to its specific use. They differ especially by size of cabin, dimension of half deck, helmsman armchair and crew seats position.

Racing  
Powerboat racing engine categories for inboard and outboard engines range from 7.5 cu in to 60 cu in. Categories range from 44 cu in to 450 cu in for inboard only. The two types of motorboat races are speed races and predicted-log race. Speed races involve boats with powerful engines competing for quickest time and take place on freshwater bodies of water on a closed course. Races are marked by buoys. For unlimited hydroplanes the race distance ranges from 5 miles to 30 miles. Hydroplanes are drag raced. Predicted-log races involve slow cabin cruisers. Predicted-log races is a competition of planning and carrying out a sea voyage. The contestants evaluate different factors and variables that they will encounter along the way. The contestant with the least error at the end of the race is the winner. Also, speedboat tour is a common tourist attraction, especially in Dubai.

Military application  
A fast craft is a vessel capable of speeds over 30 knots. HSICs (High Speed Interceptor Craft) however, trump fast craft with speeds of over 50 knots. HSICs are usually either custom or law enforcement craft. Law enforcement use these extremely fast boats to catch criminals such as smugglers or drug traffickers who use fast craft as well. The military have started to use HSICs to stop international threats such as pirates, militias, terrorists and weapons traffickers. Originally HSICs were not meant to carry large weapons. Now that the military is using them, they are being built with heavy machine guns. The boats have to be fitted with robust weight control and at the same time have heavy amour. HSICs must do without propellers to account for cavitation and vibrations.  Instead HSICs use surface drivers or water jets.

Gallery

See also

Electric boat
Go-fast boat
Launch (boat)
Motorboat racing
Motor launch
Motorsailer
Powerboating
Sterndrive
Circle of death (boating)

References

Nautical terminology
 
Vehicles introduced in 1886